Marsanne (Vivaro-Alpine: Marçana) is a commune in the Drôme department in southeastern France.

Population

Personalities
It was the birthplace of Émile Loubet (1838-1929), 7th president of the French republic.

See also
Communes of the Drôme department

References

External links

 Marsanne's history in English and French

Communes of Drôme